Tiit Kubri (born 12 July 1955 in Tartu) is an Estonian politician. 1995–1997, he was Minister without portfolio.

References

Living people
1955 births
People's Union of Estonia politicians
Government ministers of Estonia
Politicians from Tartu